Frederick Lee may refer to:

Frederick Lee, Baron Lee of Newton (1906–1984), British politician
Frederick Lee (cricketer, born 1856) (1856–1896), English cricketer
Frederick Lee (cricketer, born 1840) (1840–1922), English barrister and cricketer
Fred Lee (cricketer, born 1871) (1871–1914), English cricketer
Fred Lee (cricketer, born 1905) (1905–1977), English cricketer
Frederick Lee (priest) (1832–1902), Church of England priest and author
Frederick Richard Lee (1798–1879), English painter
Frederic Sterling Lee (1949–2014), American economist
Frederic Schiller Lee (1859–1939), American physiologist

See also
Frederick Lee Bridell (1830–1863), English painter
Fred Li (born 1955), Hong Kong politician
Lee Frederick, American actor active in the 1950s